Todd E. Creason (born May 26, 1967) is an American author of both fiction and non-fiction, who writes primarily on the topic of Freemasonry.  An active Freemason, Creason is best known as the author of the Famous American Freemasons series.

Career

As a Freemason, he is the Past Master of Ogden Lodge No. 754 (IL) Ancient Free & Accepted Masons He is a 33° Scottish Rite Mason in the Valley of Danville (IL).  He belongs to several Masonic research organizations, including the Missouri Lodge of Research, the Philalethes Society, and the Scottish Rite Research Society.  He serves as an officer in the Illinois Lodge of Research.

Shortly after becoming a Master Mason, he began researching and writing the Famous American Freemasons series, which is a collection of short profiles of famous American Freemasons and their impact on American history, culture, and leadership throughout American history. The first book in the series was released in 2007, and the second in 2009. He also published a collection of quotes in 2009 A Freemason Said That? Great Quotes of Famous Freemasons which was a companion of the series.

Creason published his novels One Last Shot in 2010, A Shot After Midnight in 2012, and Shot To Hell in 2014..

In 2012, Creason wrote and produced a dramatic video Freemasons: Friends or Foes which helped dispel myths about Freemasonry and introduced viewers to many of the famous American Freemasons Creason had featured in his Famous American Freemasons series.

He is also the founder and a regular contributor to the popular Midnight Freemasons blog.

Creason has worked at the University of Illinois at Urbana-Champaign since 1998, and is currently the business manager at the Office of Technology Management.

Works

Famous American Freemasons: Volume I, 2007. 
Famous American Freemasons: Volume II, 2009. 
 A Freemason Said That? Great Quotes of Famous Freemasons, 2009.  
One Last Shot, (A Novel) 2010. 
A Shot After Midnight, (A Novel) 2012.  
Shot To Hell, (A Novel) 2014.

Video productions

Freemasons: Friends or Foes? (2012)

References

External links 
 Official Todd E. Creason Website
 The Midnight Freemasons blog

1967 births
Living people
American non-fiction writers
University of Illinois Urbana-Champaign people
People from Danville, Illinois
Writers from Illinois